Deadly Force is a Russian detective TV series, which first appeared on television in 2000. In total from 2000 to 2005 there were 6 seasons (57 series).

It was released by Channel One Russia simultaneously as a spin-off series from Streets of Broken Lights and as its direct competitor.

One of the defining characteristics of the series are its humorous pop-culture references, pertaining to Russian and international film, TV and literature.

Plot
The action begins in 1999 in St. Petersburg. In the center of the plot are operatives of the district militsiya department and the homicide department of the command post in St. Petersburg. The first season of the series included a narrative tied to a single story (9 episodes). In the following seasons, as a rule, each series is an independent criminal detective story.

The main characters of the series are Igor Plakhov and Vasily Rogov – police officers, their service is associated with the investigation of domestic crimes and the fight against organized crime. Working for a minuscule salary and risking their lives, the heroes fulfill their duty. In the first season, the main characters are employees of the district police department. In the department, Anatoly Dukalis is transferred to Plakhov and Rogov for additional support, who in turn does not lose touch with his old acquaintances, heroes of the series The Streets of Broken Lights. Starting from the second season, the employees of the district department Plakhov, Rogov and Shishkin are transferred to the head-office, under the direct start of the general (San Sanych). Here their ways diverge from the cops (Dukalis, Volkov, Larin and Solovets). Their service makes them go to various places: (Los Angeles, Chechnya, Cote d'Azur, South Africa) and everywhere they show high professionalism, resourcefulness and sense of humor, allowing with honor to come out of the most difficult tests.

Cast
Konstantin Khabensky – senior lieutenant (from the second season – captain) Igor Sergeevich Plakhov (seasons 1–6)
Andrei Fedortsov – lieutenant (from the second season – senior lieutenant) Vasily Ivanovich Rogov (seasons 1–6)
Sergey Selin – captain Anatoly Valentinovich Dukalis (season 1)
Alexey Nilov – captain Andrei Vasilyevich Larin (season 1)
Alexander Polovtsev – Major Oleg Georgievich Solovets (season 1)
Mikhail Trukhin – Senior Lieutenant Vyacheslav Yurievich Volkov (season 1)
Yevgeny Leonov-Gladyshev – major (from the 4th season – lieutenant-colonel) Anatoly Pavlovich Shishkin (seasons 1–5)
Victor Kostetskiy – Major-General Alexander Aleksandrovich Maksimov (San Sanych) (seasons 1–6)
Sergei Kosonin – Major Maxim Pavlovich Virigin (seasons 2–6)
Yevgeny Ganelin – Major Georgiy Maksimovich Lyubimov (seasons 2–6)
Alexander Tyutyrumov – Lieutenant-Colonel Sergei Arkadievich Egorov (seasons 2–6)
Yuri Galtsev – Yuri, forensic expert (seasons 1–2)
Semyon Strugachov – Captain Semyon Chernyga, forensic expert (seasons 2–6)
Victor Soloviev – captain (from the 5th series of the 2nd season – major) Grigory Streltsov (seasons 2–6)
Viktor Bychkov – Albert Pomerantsev, informant (seasons 1–6)
Mikhail Porechenkov – Captain Nikita Andreevich Uvarov, employee of the police of morals (season 6)
Sergei Murzin – Boris Kravchenko, friend of Plakhov (seasons 1–4)
George Shtil – Fedor Ilich Petrov, father-in-law Rogova (seasons 1–6)
Olga Kalmykova – Rogov's mother-in-law (seasons 1–6)
Herman Orlov – Ivan Fedorovich Izyumov, investigator of the prosecutor's office (seasons 1, 3–4)
Nikolai Lavrov – Member of the Legislative Assembly Arkady Bogolepov (season 1)
Igor Lifanov – Sergey Anokhin, nicknamed Fan (season 1)
Stanislav Sadalsky – prosecutor Anatoly Lvovich (seasons 1, 3)
Julia Rudina – Alena, Plakhov's girlfriend (seasons 2–3)

Development
In 1998, Streets of Broken Lights, the low-budget production of TNT channel with unknown actors in the lead roles, unexpectedly earned high ratings and audience popularity. However, in 1999, after disagreements between the leadership of the TNT channel and the author of the script, Andrei Kivinov, the latter left for the rival – Channel One, where he proposed the idea of a TV series with a similar script based on his works. The co-author of the script was Andrei's former colleague at the Kirov District Department of Internal Affairs of Leningrad.

Release
In the pilot series of the project, actors who played in the series The Streets of Broken Lights were invited: Selin, Nilov, Trukhin and Polovtsev. However, then the action was completely transferred to the new heroes played by Khabensky and Fedortsov. The premiere of the series took place on March 13, 2000 on Channel One. In the premiere year, an interesting situation developed at the network; two popular series, The Streets of Broken Lights and Deadly Force, were at the same time on two competing channels NTV and Channel One with the same main characters. Moreover, according to experts of the agency "TNS Gallup Media", the rating of the premiere episodes of Deadly Force was higher.

On-set injuries
During the filming of four episodes set in the Chechen war, seventeen injuries happened on-set. Some of the accidents which required surgical care included a stuntman suffering a clavicle fracture and Khabensky being struck by a sharp stone in his temple.

Awards
Winner of the TEFI award in 2000 for the Best TV series.

References

External links 
 
 Deadly Force on Channel One

2000s Russian television series
2000 Russian television series debuts
2006 Russian television series endings
Channel One Russia original programming
Films directed by Aleksandr Rogozhkin
 Russian police procedural television series
Russian crime television series
Russian police comedy television series
Russian workplace comedy television series
Fictional portrayals of the Saint Petersburg Police
Russian workplace drama television series